The 1840 United States presidential election in South Carolina took place between October 30 and December 2, 1840, as part of the 1840 United States presidential election. The state legislature chose 11 representatives, or electors to the Electoral College, who voted for President and Vice President.

South Carolina cast 11 electoral votes for the Democratic candidate Martin Van Buren. These electors were chosen by the South Carolina General Assembly, the state legislature, rather than by popular vote.

Results

References

South Carolina
1840
1840 South Carolina elections